Far til Fire, (English Title: Father of Four), is a 1953 Danish family comedy directed by Alice O'Fredericks and starring Ib Schønberg and Birgitte Bruun. The film is based on the comic strip by Kaj Engholm and Olav Hast. It was the inaugural film in a series of eight Father of Four films made by ASA Films, one each year from 1953 to 1961.

Cast
Ib Schønberg as Father; Schønberg also played the role in the first sequel, but unfortunately died before they could finish any further films and was then replaced by Karl Stegger in the next 6 films. Niels Olsen plays the father in the reimagined series of the 2000s.
Birgitte Bruun as Søs; Bruun, later known as Birgitte Price, played the part in the first six films.
Rudi Hansenas Mie
Otto Møller Jensen as Ole; Jensen played the role in all of the first films and then left acting for fashion design.
Ole Neumann as Little Per; Neumann was 5-years-old when he played Per, and played the same role in each of the first seven sequels. He later became a documentary cinematographer
Peter Malberg as Uncle Anders; Buster Larsen played the role of Uncle Anders in subsequent sequels
Jørgen Reenberg as Teacher Jørgen Stæhr
Ove Sprogøe as Baker Høst
Sigurd Langberg as Director Andersen
Ib Mossin as Peter
Paul Hagen as Burglar
Ilselil Larsen as Grete
Agnes Rehni as Mrs. Sejersen
Svend Aage Madsen as Kristian
Else Jarlbak as Kristian's Mother
Poul Reichhardt as himself
Einar Juhl as Pastor
Svend Bille as Train Conductor
Hugo Herrestrup
Poul Thomsen

Production
In 1947, Hakon Steffensen, editor of the Politiken newspaper wanted to start running a comic strip that depicted typical Danish life. It was his response to the surge of American comic strips flooding the European marketplace in the post-war years. Steffensen asked cartoonist Kaj Engholm for ideas. Engholm then asked his friend, advertising executive Olav Hast, who proposed the idea. They roughed out the story together of a single father of four children with the oldest daughter running the household, agreeing the father would be a single parent without ever creating a backstory for the mother's absence. In interviews, whenever the authors were asked, "Where is the mother?", they replied, "I don't know but we promise to look into it."

The comic strip first appeared in 1948 and ran daily for 40 years—on the back page of Politiken until 1955, then in the Berlingske Tidende newspaper until 1988. The text was written by Hast until retired from the strip in 1973, after which it was written by a variety of writers. Engholm drew the strip until his death in 1988.

Sequels
Father of Four was such an enormous success that a sequel Father of Four in the Snow (Far til fire i sneen) was quickly made and released in 1954. Thereafter, seven more sequels were made, one every year until 1961, all directed by Alice O'Fredericks. A ninth film was planned for release in 1962 but was never produced.

In 2005, the series was renewed with the release of Father of Four is Back (Far til fire - gi'r aldrig op) directed by Claus Bjerre and in 2006 with Father of Four: Living Large (Far til fire - i stor stil).

References

External links
IMDb
Det Danske Filmistitut
Den Danske Film Database
 

 
1950s Danish-language films
1953 films
1953 comedy films
Films directed by Alice O'Fredericks
Films scored by Sven Gyldmark
Danish comedy films
Danish black-and-white films